Flavobacterium enshiense is a Gram-negative and strictly aerobic bacterium from the genus of Flavobacterium which has been isolated from soil from Enshi City in China.

References

External links
Type strain of Flavobacterium enshiense at BacDive -  the Bacterial Diversity Metadatabase

enshiense
Bacteria described in 2013